Paul W. Hodge ( - ) was an American astronomer whose principal area of research was the stellar populations of galaxies.

Education & Employment 
Born in Seattle, Washington on November 8, 1934, Hodge grew up in the neighboring town of Snohomish. As a youth his interests were primarily physics, astronomy and music. He obtained a BS degree in physics at Yale University in 1956 and a PhD degree in astronomy at Harvard University in 1960. He was a National Science Foundation Post-doctoral Fellow at the Mt. Wilson and Palomar Observatories before joining the faculty of the University of California at Berkeley in 1961. He moved to the University of Washington in 1965, where he remained until 2006, when he became Professor Emeritus of Astronomy. Between 1984 and 2004 he was Editor in Chief of the Astronomical Journal.

Research 
Hodge was author or co-author of over 550 research papers and talks at professional meetings, as well as 28 books. Most of the papers are concerned with the extragalactic universe, especially nearby galaxies, their distances and their histories. Work on the Magellanic Clouds, carried out at observatories in South Africa, Australia and Chile, included a study of young stellar associations, of which he and his students published the first catalog. With colleague Frances Woodworth Wright, he published two widely used atlases of the Magellanic Clouds. He was the first to study the structure of the Local Group dwarf galaxies and carried out the first large-scale survey of star-forming regions (HII regions) in spiral galaxies, in which he and his students mapped a total of 13011 of these objects. He and his former student, K. Krienke, discovered 652 star clusters in the Andromeda Galaxy (M31).

In the early years of his career he also did pioneering work on the collection of interplanetary dust from the upper atmosphere. With his graduate student, Donald Brownlee, he was the first to use high-altitude aircraft (e. g., B52s and U2s) to collect candidate meteoritic dust particles. Together, they also investigated meteoritic dust from deep sea sediments and from the Moon. In related research he collected and studied meteoritic particles in the soil surrounding terrestrial meteorite craters.

A long-term mountain enthusiast, Hodge hiked extensively in the Cascade Mountains and published six books related to mountains and mountain trails. In 2001 the asteroid 14466 was named "Hodge" in his honor.

See also
  Hodge 301 star cluster

References

External links 
  Paul W. Hodge's bio at Hubble Heritage Project 
  Books by Paul W. Hodge available through Amazon.com 
  Books by Paul W. Hodge available through Open Library 
  Hubble Space Telescope Photometry of Hodge 301                         
  Chemical abundances of the LMC cluster Hodge 11 and its surrounding field 
  Detailed Abundances for Field Stars Surrounding the LMC Cluster Hodge 11 
  K-Band Red Clump Distances to the Large Magellanic Cloud Clusters Hodge 4 and NGC 1651 

1934 births
2019 deaths
American astronomers
Yale University alumni
 University of Washington faculty
Harvard University alumni
The Astronomical Journal editors